The Philippines competed at the 2012 Winter Youth Olympics in Innsbruck, Austria. The Philippine team consisted of two athletes in two sports.

Alpine skiing

The Philippines has qualified one male athlete to compete in the alpine skiing event. Abel Tesfamariam is a Filipino-Eritrean based in Switzerland.

Boy

Figure skating

Philippines has qualified 1 athlete.

Boy

See also
Philippines at the 2012 Summer Olympics

References

2012 in Philippine sport
Nations at the 2012 Winter Youth Olympics
Winter Youth Olympics, 2012